The Antarctic is the high-latitude region enclosed by the Antarctic Circle.

It may also refer to:

Places
 Antarctic Plate, a Earthly tectonic plate containing Antarctica
 Antarctica, a continent contained on the Antarctic Plate located in the Antarctic
 Antarctic Ocean, the ocean surrounding Antarctica
 Antarctic realm, a biogeographic region

Other uses
 Antarctic Press, a comic book publisher
 Antarctic (magazine), a magazine published by the New Zealand Antarctic Society
 , a Swedish steamship used in polar exploration

See also

 
 Antarctic Circle
 East Antarctic Shield, the craton of Antarctica
 France Antarctique, a short-lived French colony in Brazil
 Antarctica (disambiguation)
 Arctic (disambiguation)